This is a list of the 58 Multiple Property Submissions on the National Register of Historic Places in Florida. They contain approximately 400 individual listings of the more than 1,500 on the National Register for the state.

References

 
 NRHP Multiple Property Submissions
Florida